Supreme Islamic Shia Council (abbreviated as SISC), ( pronounced as Al Majles al Islaami al Shi'i al A'la) is the supreme body of the Shias of Lebanon and an official entity meant to give the Shia more say in government. It was established in 1967 by Sayyid Musa al-Sadr.

Establishment 
The aim of Imam Musa al-Sadr was the decrease of poverty and deprivation in Lebanon. So he needed to found new political, economics and educational institutes. As the first step, Imam Musa al-Sadr established the Supreme Islamic Shia Council (SISC). Imam Musa al-Sadr was formed a social movement by religion. He as the representative of ’Supreme Islamic Shia Council organized resource by using his effective and established institutes such as occupational institutes.

The first council was made up of 9 individuals with 3 representing the religious establishment and 6 from the notable Shia figures in Lebanon with five being members of the Lebanese Parliament. They were Imam Musa al-Sadr (as president), Sheikh Suleiman al Yahfoufi, Sheikh Khalil Ibrahim Yassin, MPs Sabri Hamadeh, Hussein el-Husseini, Fadlallah Dandache, Mohammad Abbas Yaghi, Mahmoud Ammar and the journalist Riad Taha. Also prominent in the establishment of the Council were Sheikh Mohammad Mehdi Shamseddine who later headed the Council after the disappearance of Imam Musa al-Sadr as well as Sheikh Mahmoud Rida Farhat who was the General Director of the Council.

Supreme Islamic Shia Council (in Lebanon) is the Shia independent organizations from Sunnis. The Shii intelligentsia and customary elites had participated in this council actively. Demands of Supreme Islamic shia Council was related particularly to defenses in southern Lebanon, development funds, construction and improvement of schools and hospitals, an increased number of Shia appointees into Lebanese government positions in order to improve living conditions and prospects for future employment for the Lebanese Shia and provide more proportional representation in the Lebanese government.

See also

List of people who disappeared mysteriously
List of Shi'a Muslim scholars of Islam
Modern Islamic philosophy
Ismail as-Sadr
Haydar al-Sadr
Sadr al-Din al-Sadr
Mohammad Baqir al-Sadr
Mohammad Sadeq al-Sadr
Mohammad Mohammad Sadeq al-Sadr
Lebanese people in Iran

References

External links
Supreme Islamic shia Council

1967 establishments in Lebanon
Islamic political parties in Lebanon
Political parties established in 1967
Political parties in Lebanon
Shia Islamic political parties